Cocalico Senior High School is a public secondary school in Denver, Pennsylvania,  United States, whose enrollment consists of students in grades 9-12. The school is part of the Cocalico School District, serving East Cocalico Township, West Cocalico Township, Denver, and Adamstown in northern Lancaster County.

Athletics
 Baseball
 Basketball
 Bowling
 Cheerleading
 Cross country
 Field hockey
 Football
 Golf
 Lacrosse
 Soccer
 Softball
 Swimming
 Tennis
 Track and field
 Volleyball
 Wrestling
Marching Band

References

External links
 Cocalico Senior High School
 Greatschools.net

Public high schools in Pennsylvania
Schools in Lancaster County, Pennsylvania